The North Wales Conference is a summer rugby league competition for teams in North Wales and Mid Wales.

History

The Rugby League Conference was founded in 1997 as the Southern Conference, a 10-team pilot league for teams in the South of England and English Midlands. It expanded into North Wales for the first time in 2004 when North Wales Coasters joined the North West Division of the Rugby League Conference.

The professional side Crusaders announced in December 2009 that they would leave the South Wales town of Bridgend an relocate to Wrexham in North Wales. On the back of this, the North Wales League, a proposed feeder league for the Rugby League Conference was announced in 2010.

There were intended to be four teams for the initial season: Conwy Celts established 2007 (based at Colwyn Bay); two new sides: Penrhyn Eagles (from Bangor, where there was already a university club) and Mid Wales Marauders (based in Welshpool, the only rugby league club in mid Wales) and Rhyl Exiles, who while technically a new club were formed from the ashes of recently disbanded club Rhyl Coasters (formerly North Wales Coasters). Rhyl won the North Wales 9s but pulled out of the league. Chester Gladiators A were proposed as replacements but in the end the season was cancelled.

There was no open-age league in North Wales in 2011; but the North Wales Conference got off the ground in 2012. The inaugural competition consisted of Conwy Celts, Dee Valley Dragons, Montgomeryshire Marauders, Prestatyn and Rhyl Panthers and Wrexham Bradley Raiders. Montgomeryshire Marauders folded mid-season and were replaced by Flintshire Falcons. The grand final was fought out between the top two sides: Conwy Celts and Prestatyn and Rhyl Panthers with the Celts running out 48–26 winners to be crowned the first North Wales Champions.

Rugby League Conference Pyramid

 National Conference League
 North Wales Conference

The North Wales Conference is part of tier five of the British rugby league system. Above the North Wales Conference is the National Conference League, the highest level of amateur rugby league in the UK.

2013 structures

 Conwy Celts
 Dee Valley Dragons
 Flintshire Falcons
 Prestatyn and Rhyl Panthers (failed to complete the season)
 Wrexham Bradley Raiders
 NB: the league season was't completed and the four remaining clubs were entered into playoffs to determine the champions

Participants

2012: Conwy Celts, Dee Valley Dragons, Flintshire Falcons (replaced Montgomeryshire Marauders mid-season), Prestatyn and Rhyl Panthers, Wrexham Bradley Raiders

Winners

North Wales 9s
2010 Rhyl Exiles
2011 No event
2012 Prestatyn and Rhyl Panthers
2013 Conwy Celts

North Wales Conference
2012 Conwy Celts

See also
Rugby League in Wales
Rugby League Conference
Wales Rugby League

External links
http://www.cymrurl.com

Rugby league in Wales
Rugby League Conference
Sports leagues established in 2012
Rugby league competitions in the United Kingdom